The Cut is a British television drama series. This is a list of the characters, and who portrays them.

Main characters

Actress Lara Goodison who plays Marla Mackinnon is the only actor to appear in every episode of The Cut in all three series. The following characters appear in the programme as of 18 December 2010.

Recurring characters

Cut